Aaron Charles Pauley (born August 4, 1988) is an American singer, songwriter, and musician born in Vacaville, California. He is most prominently known as the lead vocalist and bassist for the American rock band Of Mice & Men and the lead vocalist for Jamie's Elsewhere. He was also formerly the lead vocalist for Razing Alexandria.

Biography
Pauley grew up in Vacaville together with his parents Randy and Kellie Pauley, and younger brother, Samuel. He developed an interest in music at an early age and began playing guitar at the age of eight, and began playing bass at age 11. Pauley joined his first band, Menace to Society, at the age of 13. He graduated from Vacaville High School in 2006. Two years later, he joined the Sacramento-based Jamie's Elsewhere as a vocalist and recorded two albums with them. He joined Of Mice & Men in 2012.

Pauley currently lives in Huntington Beach with his fiancée Amanda Bouffard and his Boston Terrier, Daisy.

Discography
All credits were taken from Pauley's AllMusic credits list.
With Jamie's Elsewhere
They Said a Storm Was Coming (2010)
Reimagined (EP, 2012)

With Of Mice & Men
 Restoring Force (2014)
 Cold World (2016)
 Defy (2018)
 Earthandsky (2019)
 Echo (2021)

Collaborations and other songs

References

21st-century American singers
American heavy metal bass guitarists
American male bass guitarists
American heavy metal singers
Nu metal singers
1988 births
Living people
21st-century American bass guitarists
21st-century American male singers